Juazeiro, formerly also known as Joazeiro, is a municipality in the state of Bahia, in the northeastern region of Brazil.

The city is twinned with Petrolina, in the state of Pernambuco. The two cities are connected by a modern bridge crossing the São Francisco River. Together they form the metropolitan region of Petrolina-Juazeiro, an urban conglomerate of close to 500,000 inhabitants.

History 

It was founded in 1833  and became a city on July 15, 1878.
Its name comes from the  tree which grows in the region.

Organization 

Its city districts are Abóbora, Carnaíba, Itamotinga, Junco, Juremal, Massaroca,  and Pinhões.

Geography

Climate 

The annual average temperature is 24.2 °C. Although it lies on the São Francisco River and the Curaçá River, the climate of the city is semi-arid and it gets an annual precipitation of only 399 mm (15.7 in.).

Transport 

There are highway connections with several capitals of the Northeast and railroad connections to the coast are made by the Ferrovia Centro-Atlântica. The railroad connection ends at the fluvial port of Juazeiro.

Economy 

Like its sister city Petrolina, Juazeiro has experienced great growth in the last decade due to the irrigation of the semi-arid soils with water from the São Francisco River.  Fruit cultivation is important to such an extent that Juazeiro entitles itself "Capital of Irrigated Fruit", which is exported between the Petrolina Airport to United States and/or Europe.  For more detailed information on the development of this fertile valley see the article on Petrolina.

The main agricultural products in planted area according to the IBGE in 2003:

 bananas: 18 km2
 coconut: 2.72 km2
 guava: 2.5 km2
 lemon: 2 km2
 papaya: 0.45 km2
 mango: 60 km2
 passion fruit: 0.9 km2
 grapes: 21 km2
 sugarcane: 152.53 km2
 onions: 3.4 km2
 beans: 4.04 km2
 manioc: 4.2 km2
 watermelon: 4.5 km2
 melon: 1.95 km2
 tomato: 0.32 km2

Sport
Both the city's professional football teams play at the Estádio Adauto Moraes: Juazeiro SC founded 1995, and SD Juazeirense founded in 2006.

Notable people 

Juazeiro is the birthplace of the following famous people:

Dani Alves: right back footballer of Sao Paulo FC and Brazil national team, formerly of Bahia, FC Barcelona, and Sevilla.
João Gilberto: precursor of the bossa nova movement and guitarist/songwriter
Ivete Sangalo, the Latin Grammy Award-winning Brazilian singer

See also 
 Roman Catholic Diocese of Juazeiro

References

External links 
 Prefeitura Municipal de Juazeiro

Municipalities in Bahia
Populated places established in 1833
1833 establishments in Brazil